Kate Ho is an economics professor at Princeton University. Since July 2018, Professor Ho has worked in partnership with Janet Currie, as a co-director of Princeton's Center for Health and Wellbeing.  Ho specializes in the medical care market and its industrial organization with an emphasis on health insurers and hospitals. Ho studies how price effects and the conditions of care provided by hospitals. She has received several awards for her academic research. Professor Ho is a frequent keynote speaker at conferences across the United States of America.

Education 
Kate Ho obtained a Bachelor of Arts (B.A.) and Master of Arts (M.A.) in Mathematics from Cambridge University in June 1993. She then proceeded to attend Harvard University where she acquired a Master of Economics (A.M.) in 2003, and a Ph.D. in Business Economics in 2005.

Career 
Before formally starting her career in academia, Kate served as a Chief of Staff to the Minister of State for Health, for the UK Government Department of Health from 1993 to 1997. Following this position, she became a Junior Associate for McKinsey & Company, Inc, from 1997 to 1999. Professor Ho joined Columbia University's Department of Economics as an assistant professor from 2005 to 2009. Succeeding this position, Ho became an associate professor at this same institution. Kate has also spent time at Northwestern University in 2008 as a visiting associate professor in their Center for the Study of Industrial Organization, and at Yale University in 2009, as a visiting faculty member with the Cowles Foundation for Research in Economics. She also taught as a visiting associate professor at Wharton's School of the University of Pennsylvania in the fall of 2014, in their department of Business Economics and Public Policy. Currently, she instructs at Princeton University as a Professor of Economics, while maintaining her role as co-director for Princeton's Center for Health and Wellbeing.

In addition, Kate Ho is affiliated with the National Bureau of Economic Research (NBER), where she has worked as a research fellow, since 2013. Furthermore, she also holds a co-editor position at Econometrica In the past, Kate has also been an editorial board member for the RAND Journal of Economics, the American Economic Journal: Economic Policy., the American Economic Review, the American Economic Journal: Microeconomics, and the Journal of Economic Literature.

Selected scholarship

"The Evolution of Health Insurer Costs in Massachusetts, 2010-12" (2018) 
In collaboration with Ariel Pakes, and Mark Shepard, Kate Ho and her colleagues, investigate the state of Massachusetts from 2010-2012 in relation to its costs of health insurance, targeting the progression of its enrollees. Their focus on Massachusetts, is a result of their immense range of medical prices amongst their hospitals. More specifically, it is noted that several hospitals were paid around twice the amount for a procedure, compared to others in the state. They gathered their information from the Massachusetts All-Payer Claims Database (APCD) as a way of visualizing the progression of costs for healthcare during this time period. This time span was chosen as Health Maintenance Organizations (HMOs) made the decision to incentivize their physicians with control of costs, while Preferred Provider Organizations (PPOs), opted out of doing so. They stress the importance of recognizing two components before having a proper impression of the cost growth; “Consumers switching between plans, and differences in costs characteristics between new entrants and those leaving the market.” They mention that during this span, global payment usage, “non-fee-for-service” payments, nearly doubled in this state. These global payments are designed to divide associated risks with providers to promote a reduction in costs. Through use of a risk-adjusted decomposition of the enrollees cost growth, they find that HMOs have a more gradual cost increase than PMOs which may be due to individuals with better health levels transitioning from PMOs to HMOs. Alternatively, individuals with declining health rates will move from an HMO to a PMO. They connect the idea that these tactics used by HMOs, led to healthier individuals using them instead of PMOs. Hence, the researchers state that this creates further incentives to endorse these global payments.

"The Business Case for Diabetes Disease Management for Managed Care Organizations" (2006) 
In conjunction with Nancy Beaulieu, David M. Cutler, George Isham, Tammie Lindquist, Andrew Nelson and Patrick O’Connor, Kate Ho and associates, explore diabetes disease management. They recognize that diabetes diagnosis’ are frequently occurring and rather expensive, and that 40 percent of those living with it, are unable to attain proper medical care management. With assistance from a Minnesota health care program, HealthPartners, the team uses their data to investigate the business case. The researchers attempt to find an answer to whether or not diabetes disease management programs are worth the investment. They state that health plans that implement a disease management program for individuals with diabetes are subjected to higher premiums and can increase their medical care savings. They are able to pinpoint certain aspects that can impede the business case for health plans; adverse selection, contracting, turnovers and network externalities. In specific, contracting difficulties, means that individuals with diabetes will have to absorb more insurance costs and this payment process proves to be difficult. Overall, they find feasible evidence that health plans can obtain economic benefits from developing better diabetes management care. A more important find is that individuals living with the disease will have an increase in the quality of their lives, if healthcare management plans choose to better themselves.

"Insurer-Provider Networks in the Medical Care Market" (2005) 
In this work, Ho aims to discover the origins and welfare effects of hospital networks. She recognizes that there is a lack of research in regard to restrictions implemented by insurance agencies in hospital networks that allow their consumers to have a freedom of choice. With the use of data from care plans in 43 US markets, she reveals that markets that have a minimal amount of hospitals and insurance providers, with a significant amount of possible contracts, fail to come to a concise agreement. When hospitals form alliances, referred to as “systems”, they impact the degree to which insurance companies and hospitals can bargain. When this occurs, it is revealed through her analysis that these systems have a tendency to seize 19 per cent markups, as opposed to hospitals that do not enter into systems, as they claim zero markups. Furthermore, she notes that hospitals who have high expectations that their beds will be occupied, may actually be incentivized to invest less in regard to their capacity. Her research provides evidence that more hospital beds would positively affect consumers with $330,000 in benefits for each bed, which would still exceed the profits produced by the hospitals and insurers. Therefore, hospitals that are constrained by their capacity, are not incentivized to invest, due to this process of bargaining, amounting to less benefits for the consumers. Ultimately, an important outcome of these results, is that it highlights the ideal bargaining models that can be used for price negotiation in relation to hospital-health plans.

"The Welfare Effects of Restricted Hospital Choice in the US Medical Care Market" (2005) 
Published in 2005, Ho performed research to analyze the effect on welfare, when health insurers restrain their consumers' ability to choose a hospital in a network, where they would then be treated. The network that has been chosen ultimately impacts consumer welfare, the design of new technology, the amount of profit captured by the hospitals, and whether or not the hospital will decide to invest in expanding capacity. By obtaining data from 43 US healthcare plan markets, Kate executes a three-step econometric model. This is devised in order to forecast enrollee's demand for a healthcare plan, based on the hospital networks that they will have access to. Her results do in fact show that when in the process of deciding a healthcare plan, consumers substantially and positively value the expected utility from the potential network of hospitals. Furthermore, with the usage of a welfare analysis, Ho finds that these selective networks actually cause an annual one billion dollar societal loss in these markets.

Other research 

 Dafny, Leemore, Kate Ho, and Robin S. Lee. 2019. "The Price Effects of cross‐market Mergers: Theory and Evidence from the Hospital Industry." The RAND Journal of Economics 50 (2): 286-325.
Ho, Kate, Robin S. Lee, Research, National Bureau of Economic, and NBER Working Papers. 2017. Equilibrium Provider Networks: Bargaining and Exclusion in Health Care Markets National Bureau of Economic Research.
 Ho, Kate, Robin S. Lee, Research, National Bureau of Economic, and NBER Working Papers. 2013. Insurer Competition in Health Care Markets. Place of publication not identified: National Bureau of Economic Research.
 Gaynor, Martin, Kate Ho, Robert Town, and NBER Working Papers. 2014. The Industrial Organization of Health Care Markets. Place of publication not identified: National Bureau of Economic Research.
 Ho, Kate, Ariel Pakes, Research, National Bureau of Economic, and NBER Working Papers. 2013. Hospital Choices, Hospital Prices and Financial Incentives to Physicians. Place of publication not identified: National Bureau of Economic Research.
 Dafny, Leemore and NBER Working Papers. 2010. Let them have Choice: Gains from Shifting Away from Employer-Sponsored Health Insurance and Toward an Individual Exchange. Place of publication not identified: National Bureau of Economic Research.
 Ho, Justin, Katherine Ho, Julie Holland Mortimer, National Bureau of Economic Research, and NBER Working Papers. 2010. Analyzing the Welfare Impacts of Full-Line Forcing Contracts. Vol. working paper 16318; working paper no. 16318.;. Cambridge, MA: National Bureau of Economic Research.
 Ho, Katherine. 2009. "Barriers to Entry of a Vertically Integrated Health Insurer: An Analysis of Welfare and Entry Costs." Journal of Economics & Management Strategy 18 (2): 487-545.

Awards and recognition 
In 2006, Ho received the Richard Stone Prize in Applied Econometrics for her academic paper, "The Welfare Effects of Restricted Hospital Choice in the US Medical Care Market". She was chosen as the recipient for the Arrow Award for Best Paper of the Year in 2010, due to paper, “Insurer-Provider Networks in the Medical Care Market.” Her most recent recognition of achievement has been the Paul Geroski Award for Best Paper of the Year in 2012 for her work on, “Location and Competition in Retail Banking.” In 2019, Ho was announced as a fellow of the Econometric Society. Kate Ho and Robin Lee won the 2020 Frisch Medal Award for their paper "Insurer Competition in Health Care Markets”

Speaking engagements 

 Speaker at a plenary session for the 17th annual International Industrial Organization Conference in 2019
 Speaker at a Stanford Industrial Organization Seminar in 2019
 Plenary speaker at the American Society of Health Economists in 2019
 Speaker at the 8th annual Federal Trade Commission Microeconomics Conference in 2015

References 

Living people
Year of birth missing (living people)
Princeton University faculty
Alumni of the University of Cambridge
Harvard University alumni
American women economists
Fellows of the Econometric Society
21st-century American women